Everstiluutnantti (Lieutenant colonel, Swedish: Överstelöjtnant) is an officer's rank in Finland, immediately above Majuri (Major) and below Eversti (Colonel).

History
During peacetime, an everstiluutnantti is the commander of a battalion or a chief of staff for a regiment or brigade. The rank requires completion of a staff officer course.  Only a few reservists have obtained the rank of everstiluutnantti. It requires active participation in national defence and a demanding wartime position.

References

See also 
 Finnish military ranks

Military ranks of Finland

fi:Everstiluutnantti